Costa Rican Space Agency is a space research and development bureau based in San Jose, Costa Rica, and was founded by the Constitutional Congress of Costa Rica. It is the first space agency to be created and operated by a Central American nation.

References 

Space agencies
Institutions of Costa Rica